Women's wrestling may refer to

Women's amateur wrestling
Women's professional wrestling

See also
Wrestling